Ayrshire Football Association or Ayrshire Football League or variation, may refer to:

 Ayrshire Football League (1891-1895;1900-1901)
 Ayrshire Football Combination (1893-1897)
 Ayrshire and Renfrewshire Football League (1903-1905)
 Ayrshire Junior Football League (1919-2002)
 Ayrshire Amateur Football Association (est. 1935)